Front Page Sports: Baseball Pro '98 is a baseball sports video game released for Microsoft Windows in 1997. It was developed and published by Sierra On-Line, and is part of the Front Page Sports Baseball series.

Reception

The game received favorable reviews according to the review aggregation website GameRankings.

References

External links
 

1997 video games
Major League Baseball video games
Sierra Entertainment games
Windows games
Windows-only games
Video games developed in the United States